= The Great Miami Rowing Center =

Non-profit rowing community in Hamilton, Ohio, USA

The Great Miami Rowing Center (GMRC) is a non-profit 501(c)(3) rowing community founded in 2006. Located in historic downtown Hamilton, Ohio, GMRC was started as part of Hamilton Vision 2020, a broader initiative, which "encompasses many aspirations and dimensions, but its main goal has been to design a framework for action that serves as a dynamic and living plan for our City."

GMRC hosts teams for youth, collegiate, and masters rowers. The center also provides classes to the public.
